The Crow River is a river in the Saint Lawrence River drainage basin in the Unorganized South Part of Nipissing District in northeastern Ontario, Canada. The river lies entirely within Algonquin Provincial Park and is a right tributary of the Petawawa River.

Course
The river begins at Inez Lake in the geographic township of Freswick and flows south into Bower geographic township to Redrock Lake, then east to Proulx Lake and then northwest to Little Crow Lake and Big Crow Lake. It heads northeast over a series of rapids, enters Anglin geographic township and reaches Crow Bay on Lavielle Lake. The river leaves northeast over the Lake Lavielle Dam, enters White geographic township, passes over a series of rapids, turns northwest, then heads north and reaches its mouth at the Petawawa River. The Petawawa River flows via the Ottawa River to the Saint Lawrence River.

Tributaries
Moon Creek (left)
White Partridge Creek (right)
Okahan Creek (left)
Lavielle Lake
Thomas Creek (right)
Osprey Creek (right)
Dickson Creek (right)
Farncomb Creek (left)
Abbe Creek (left)
Woodcock Creek (left)
Thrush Creek (left)
Shadfly Creek (left)
Koko Creek (right)
Nepawin Creek (left)
Diver Creek (right)

See also
List of rivers of Ontario

References

Sources

Rivers of Nipissing District
Tributaries of the Ottawa River